The Tomb may refer to:

 The Tomb (1986 film), directed by Fred Olen Ray
 The Tomb (2007 film), directed by Ulli Lommel
 The Tomb (2009 film), directed by Michael Staininger
 The Tomb (comics), by Nunzio DeFilippis and Christina Weir
 "The Tomb" (Moon Knight), a 2022 episode of the series
 The Tomb (novel), by F. Paul Wilson, 1984
 "The Tomb" (short story), by H. P. Lovecraft, 1922
 "The Tomb" (Stargate SG-1), a 2021 episode of the series
 The Tomb, a 2004 Italian horror film directed by Bruno Mattei

Other uses
 La Tumba, a 1964 novel by José Agustín

See also
 The Tombs (disambiguation)
 Tomb (disambiguation)